Ivan Aleksandrovich Markelov (born 17 April 1988) is a Russian professional football player who plays as a left winger or forward for Amkar Perm.

Club career
He made his Russian Premier League debut for FC Orenburg on 30 July 2016, in a game against FC Rostov.

On 20 June 2017, he signed a 2-year contract with FC Anzhi Makhachkala.

On 9 July 2019, he signed a 1-year contract with Russian Premier League newcomer FC Tambov. The contract was dissolved by mutual consent in early September 2019.

On 18 February 2020, Markelov signed for Kazakhstan Premier League club Kyzylzhar.

Career statistics

Club

Notes

References

External links
 
 

1988 births
Footballers from Moscow
Living people
Russian footballers
Russian expatriate footballers
Association football midfielders
FC Vityaz Podolsk players
FC Dynamo Saint Petersburg players
FC Sokol Saratov players
FC Orenburg players
FC Dynamo Moscow players
FC Anzhi Makhachkala players
FC Zenit-2 Saint Petersburg players
FC Petrotrest players
FC Tambov players
FC Kyzylzhar players
FC Amkar Perm players
Russian Premier League players
Russian Second League players
Russian First League players
Kazakhstan Premier League players
Russian expatriate sportspeople in Kazakhstan
Expatriate footballers in Kazakhstan